New College Leicester (formed in 1999/2000 in a merger between New Parks Community College, Alderman Newton's School, and Wycliffe Community College) is a coeducational foundation secondary school and sixth form, located in the New Parks area of Leicester in the English county of Leicestershire.

New College Leicester became a foundation school in June 2010. As a foundation school it is administered by a trust which includes Leicester City Council, Wyggeston and Queen Elizabeth I College and the CfBT Education Trust.

The school offers GCSEs, BTECs and ASDAN qualifications as programmes of study for pupils; those in the sixth form have the option to study from a range of A Levels and further BTECs.

References

External links
New College Leicester official website

Secondary schools in Leicester
Foundation schools in Leicester